Saamida is a 2008 Tamil film directed by V. C. Vadivudaiyan and starring Pondy Ravi, Dhanushya. The film is scored by Indhrajith and was released on 6 December 2008.

Plot 

The film begins with a girl from Ramanathapuram who has been sold into prostitution. The unnamed girl is suffering from hunger and finds it difficult to make ends meet. A former regular client becomes her husband - a man who was shaped by awful experiences into a feared gang leader. The terrible things that the girl witnesses at the hands of her husband drives her to become a female gang leader, with the help of a loyal orphan.

Everyone was afraid when they went to see Kasi. They were involved in illegal alcohol, drugs and killing any enemies who are against them by Saami. In the meantime, Saami fell in love with the heroine Pelo and began doing illegal things without her lover. When she discovers this, she tried to change his mind.

Cast
Pondy Ravi as Saami (credited as Sembi)
Dhanushya
Amsadevi as Maaji

Production
VC Vadivudayan made his directorial debut with this film. The film was entirely shot at Kasi. Pondy Ravi who earlier played supporting and negative roles made his debut as lead actor with this film.

Music 
The film music was composed by debutant Indrajith ET. The soundtrack was released on 14 October 2008 by director A.R.Murugadoss. Behindwoods wrote "The album does leave you a little melancholic after you listen to it. There are no original music bits to add charm or lighten the mood". Songs:

"Rakshasa Raja" - Ananth, Ganga
"Onrai Ondru" - Prasanna, Ganga, Sam P. Keerthan
"Kadhal Desathile" - Ananth, Sam P. Keerthan
"Hey Machina" - Vinaya Sathyan
"Aayudham Yendha" - Ananth
"Aanavam Azhinthadi" - Adarsh, Gopal Sharma, Vadivudayan VC

Release

Critical reception
Behindwoods criticised the film saying that "the botched up screen play, mind numbing action sequences and a sub-plot of a love tale that ridicules the viewer’s common sense makes up for the rest". Sify wrote "Apart from some decent visuals, the film has nothing really new by way of story or screenplay".

Box-office
The film took a below average opening and grossed Rs. 213,940 at box office.

References

External links 
 Saamida - Movie Review - Reference at the Nanbargal.Com

2008 films
2000s Tamil-language films
Indian action films
Films shot in Uttar Pradesh
2000s masala films
Indian gangster films
2008 directorial debut films
Films directed by Vadivudaiyan
2008 action films